Lewis Weld may refer to:

 Lewis Hart Weld (1875–1964), American entomologist
 Lewis Ledyard Weld (1833–1865), American lawyer, politician, and Union Army officer